Olena Sydorenko (born 20 January 1974) is a former Ukrainian volleyball player. She was part of the Ukraine women's national volleyball team.

She participated at the 1996 Summer Olympics.
She also competed at the 2001 Women's European Volleyball Championship.

References

External links
 
 
 

 http://www.cev.lu/Competition-Area/PlayerDetails.aspx?TeamID=7811&PlayerID=19350&ID=560
 Olena Sydorenko at Sports Reference
 http://www.todor66.com/volleyball/Olympics/Women_1996.html
 http://www.todor66.com/volleyball/Europe/Women_2001.html

1974 births
Living people
Ukrainian women's volleyball players
Olympic volleyball players of Ukraine
Volleyball players at the 1996 Summer Olympics
Place of birth missing (living people)